The 2013–14 Danish 1st Division season is the 18th season of the Danish 1st Division league championship, governed by the Danish Football Association.

The division-champion and runners-up are promoted to the 2014–15 Danish Superliga. The teams in the 11th and 12th places are relegated to the 2014–15 Danish 2nd Divisions.

Participants
AC Horsens and Silkeborg IF finished the 2012–13 season of the Superliga in 11th and 12th place, respectively, and were relegated to the 1st Division. They replaced Viborg FF and FC Vestsjælland, who were promoted to the 2013–14 Danish Superliga.

Hvidovre IF and BK Marienlyst won promotion from the 2012–13 Danish 2nd Divisions. They replaced Skive IK and FC Fyn.

As of 1 July 2013 FC Hjørring will participate under the name Vendsyssel FF.

Stadia and locations

Personnel and sponsoring 
Note: Flags indicate national team as has been defined under FIFA eligibility rules. Players and Managers may hold more than one non-FIFA nationality.

Managerial changes

League table

See also
2013–14 in Danish football

References

External links
  Danish FA

2
Dan
Danish 1st Division seasons